"My Turn" is a song performed by Swedish singer John Lundvik. The song made it to the final of Melodifestivalen 2018 from the first semi-final.

Charts

References

2018 singles
English-language Swedish songs
John Lundvik songs
Melodifestivalen songs of 2018
Swedish pop songs
Songs written by John Lundvik